Jargari is a small village near Khanna, Punjab, in northwest India. It comes under Tehsil Payal Dist. Ludhiana.

Gurudwara Sahib 
A gurudwara (Punjabi: ਗੁਰਦੁਆਰਾ, gurduārā or ਗੁਰਦਵਾਰਾ, gurdwārā; sometimes transliterated from Punjabi as gurdwara), meaning  "the doorway to the guru", is a place of worship for Sikhs. A gurudwara is also referred to as a "Sikh temple".

Jargari Pind

Nearby villages 
Below is the list of nearest villages:

References

  
Villages in Ludhiana district